Solea may refer to:

 Solea, a simple sandal with a thong between the toes and a hobnailed sole from Roman times
 Soleá, a form of Flamenco music
 Solea (novel) by Jean-Claude Izzo
 Soléa, a public transit system in the French city of Mulhouse
 Solea (plant), a plant genus now considered a synonym of Viola
 Solea (fish), a genus of fishes
 Soleá (singer) (born 2011), Spanish singer who represented Spain in the Junior Eurovision Song Contest 2020

See also
Soleas